João Alves (13 December 1925 − 28 June 2013) was a Portuguese Catholic bishop.

Alves was born on 13 December 1925 in Torres Novas.

Ordained in 1951, Alves was named bishop in 1975. In 1976, he was appointed bishop of the Diocese of Coimbra and retired in 2001.

Alves died on 28 June 2013, aged 87, in Coimbra.

References

1925 births
People from Torres Novas
2013 deaths
20th-century Roman Catholic bishops in Portugal